Gan International Airport (GIA)  is an international airport located on the island of Gan in Addu Atoll (previously known as Seenu Atoll) in the island nation of the Maldives.  As of June 2019, it is one of three international airports in the Maldives.

History

First built by the Royal Navy (RN) for its Fleet Air Arm (FAA), it was subsequently transferred to the Royal Air Force (RAF), becoming Royal Air Force Station Gan, commonly known merely as RAF Gan.  It was a British military airbase, used as a staging post for RAF aircraft transiting to the Far East during World War II, until 1976.  The first aircraft, an RAF Westland Walrus biplane landed on the crushed coral runway of Gan on 8 February 1943.

In 1976, the RAF left Gan, having no further need for its facilities, and handed it back to the Maldives government.  After a period of abandonment, the island and airfield was left to fall into disrepair for many years.  Funding was subsequently found to develop the island, and it then became a civilian domestic airport.

Current use
Gan Airport (in its civilian incarnation) was originally run by the Government of Maldives (GoM), with technical assistance from Maldives Airports Company Limited (MACL) until January 2010.  In June 2009, a public enterprise by the name of Gan Airport Company Limited (GACL) was established by H.E. President Mohamed Nasheed as part of GoM's privatisation policy.  GACL took over management of Gan Airport in January 2010.

To promote tourism and other economic activity in the south Maldives, a new venture was formed early in 2012 to further develop and expand Gan Airport to international airport standard.  A joint venture was formed between GACL, MACL, and State Trading Organization Plc (STO).  Renaming to Gan International Airport (GIA), the new venture is Addu International Airport Private Limited (AIA), which now owns and manages Gan International Airport.  , 70% of AIA is held by the government of Maldives, and 30% by KASA Holdings Private Limited.

Facilities
Gan International Airport is capable of accommodating ICAO code 4E aircraft.

Airlines and destinations

, the following airlines offer regularly scheduled services:

Statistics
, the only foreign operator to Gan is SriLankan Airlines, using Airbus A320 aircraft.

Incidents and accidents
On 12 March 2019, a Maldivian Bombardier Dash 8 Q300 suffered a landing gear malfunction, due to which the plane circled around the airport for one hour.  The aircraft landed safely, but the landing gear was not fully retracted.  This was the first incident to occur in Gan International Airport.

References

External links

Gan International Airport (GIA)
FNS NOTAM search for VRMG
Asian Academy of Aeronautics (AAA) — flying training school based at Gan International Airport

Aerial photograph of Gan airport aircraft parking apron and terminal

Airports in the Maldives
Addu Atoll